Kokomo Transmission Plant is a Chrysler automotive factory in Kokomo, Indiana that manufactures propulsion transmissions. The 3.1 mil Sq Ft. factory opened in 1956 at 2401 S Reed Rd.

Products

Current 
Machining of engine block castings and transmission components (aluminum and steel):
 Chrysler 40TES/41TES transmission FWD
 Chrysler 62TE transmission FWD
 Chrysler 845RE transmission RWD
 Chrysler 850RE transmission RWD
 Machining of engine block castings and transmission components (aluminum and steel)

Transmission for the models Jeep Grand Cherokee, Chrysler 300, Dodge Charger, Dodge Challenger, Dodge Durango, Ram 1500.

Former 
 Chrysler 45RFE transmission
 Chrysler 4RE transmission RWD
 Chrysler 48RE transmission RWD
 Chrysler 41TE transmission FWD
 Chrysler 40TE transmission FWD
 Chrysler 42RLE transmission RWD

References

External links
 

Chrysler factories
Motor vehicle assembly plants in Indiana
Companies based in Kokomo, Indiana